Black beans sticky rice (khao niew tua dum) is a Thai dessert made of glutinous rice, black beans and coconut milk. It is available throughout the year, unlike seasonal desserts such as mango sticky rice and durian sticky rice. It can have other ingredients added to make variations such as colorful rice like white with black Thai sticky rice. Black beans sticky rice is served warm. In Thailand, Black beans sticky rice is a street food style dessert.

Ingredient 
The common ingredients used are sticky rice (glutinous rice), black beans, sugar, salt, and palm sugar.

Preparation 
The black beans should be tender without a broken skin and soaked overnight. The sticky rice should be soaked between 4 hours and overnight. The coconut milk sauce should not be white, but lightly purple and smooth without curds. The palm sugar must have smoky flavor and smell, which is different from regular sugar when it is burned. It smells very sweet, unlike regular sugar, which is without scent when burned.

Procedures 
 Steam sticky rice for 25–30 minutes. Simmer the coconut milk in the saucepan over low heat then add ¼ cup of sugar and ¼ teaspoon of salt. Stir until sugar and salt are dissolved and remove from heat. Add the rice in cooked coconut sauce, stir the mixture and cover for 30 minutes. 
 Add cup of coconut milk and 2 cup of water in a saucepan over medium heat then add the palm sugar and ¼ teaspoon of salt, stir until dissolved. Add the black beans to boil in the coconut sauce. Lower the heat and simmer until the sauce darkens. Remove from heat. 
 Put ½ cup of sticky rice into serving bowl and pour over the desired coconut milk/black bean mixture.

Variations 
Variations include pandan sticky rice, Thai black sticky rice and magenta plant sticky rice.

References 

 Black Beans Sticky Rice. (2015, February 1). Retrieved March 17, 2017, from http://www.cooking-thai-recipes.com/black-beans-sticky-rice.html 
 G. (2018, February 1). วิธีทำข้าวเหนียว(มูนจากหม้อหุงข้าว)กะทิถั่วดำ รีบลงก่อนที่จะลืม >_<". Retrieved March 17, 2017, from https://pantip.com/topi

Thai desserts and snacks